Komando Daerah Militer XVII/Cenderawasih or Kodam XVII/Cenderawasih (XVII Military Regional Command/Cenderawasih), is a military area command of the Indonesian Army, as the 17th (Roman numeral "XVII") Kodam, which is responsible for the defense of the Provinces of Papua, South Papua, Central Papua and Highland Papua.

Brief history 

The military region was established on 8 August 1962 after Operation Trikora in which the Indonesian National Armed Forces took part in the invasion of the West Papua, in then Netherlands New Guinea. Major General Rukman was appointed its first commanding general, and the command was responsible for the Indonesian Contingent Western Papua (Kontingen Indonesia Irian Barat (KOTINDO)), the Indonesian infiltration units which were deployed to the region during Operation Trikora. It included Detachment A based in Merauke, Detachment B based in Kaimana, Detachment C based in Fakfak, and Detachment D based in Sorong. Kotindo was part of United Nation Security Force (UNSF) which was the security force of United Nations Temporary Executive Authority following the September 1962 New York Agreement.

Its Command Day is marked every 17 May marking the 1963 formal handover of West Papua to the Republic of Indonesia. In the same year, Ahmad Yani executed Operation Wishnumurti, to send divisions from Java, Makassar, and Moluccas, to supplement Kotindo forces. The formation of Kodam XVII/Irian Barat was on 17 August 1962, although it did not have any units assigned. On 30 June 1964, the name was changed to Kodam XVII/Tjendrawasih. It was further expanded with more battalions, which includes Batallion 751/Tjendrawasih in Manokwari which was formed from Kodam VII/Diponegoro, Yonif 752/Tjendrawasih in Sorong from Kodam VI/Siliwangi, and Yonif 753/Tjendrawasih in Jayapura. These three units were reorganisation from Yonif 641/Tjendrawasih I from Diponegoro and Yonif 642/Tjendrawasih II from Siliwangi which also integrated infiltration forces of Trikora, guerrilla forces of Cassowary Battalion of Arfai, and former members of PVK, after they had been trained in Siliwangi and Diponegoro.

Previously Irian Jaya and the Maluku islands were under Kodam VIII/Trikora, formed in 1984. Kodam VIII/Trikora had in 1997 six infantry battalions plus engineer detachments. The district commands in 1997 included Korem 171 (HQ Manokwari), Korem 172 (HQ Abepura), Korem 173 (HQ Biak) and Korem 174 (HQ Ambon). The South Pacific Yearbook reported three infantry battalions which were based at Manokwari, Jayapura, and Sorong, as well as mentioning a naval base at Biak. The military command derives its name (Cenderawasih) from the Indonesian word for the bird-of-paradise, which is native to Papua.

On June 8, 2012, the Indonesian Police told AFP that one person was killed and 17 wounded when Indonesian soldiers opened fire on civilians after a deadly dispute sparked by a road accident in Papua province. The shootings took place late on June 7, 2012, after residents, angry that two soldiers on a motorcycle hit and injured a child, stabbed one of the troops to death and seriously injured the other in Wamena: "Following the road accident soldiers... arrived in two trucks and took revenge by firing gunshots toward local residents and setting a number of houses on fire," national police spokesman Saud Usman Nasution said. "The trouble then spread to the city centre where a number of shops and houses were also damaged by gunshots," he told AFP.

Territorial units 
The Territorial Units in Kodam XVII/Cenderawasih include three Military Area Commands (Korem):

 172nd Military Area Command/Praja Wira Yakthi with HQ in Jayapura
1701st Military District Command
1702nd Military District Command
1712nd Military District Command
1715th Military District Command
756th Infantry Battalion
 173rd Military Area Command/Praja Vira Braja with HQ in Biak
1703rd Military District Command
1705th Military District Command
1708th Military District Command
1709th Military District Command
1714th Military District Command
753rd Special Raider Infantry Battalion
 174th Military Area Command/Anim Ti Waninggap with HQ in Merauke
1707th Military District Command
1710th Military District Command
1711st Military District Command
757th Infantry Battalion

Combat/combat-support units 
 751st Special Raider Infantry Battalion/Vira Jaya Sakti
 3rd Cavalry Detachment (Independent)/Srigala Ceta
 10th Engineers Detachment/Ksatria Yudha Dharma
 11th Engineers Detachment/Mit Anim
 12th Engineers Detachment/Ohar'o Hesowa Hubana

Training units 
 17th Regional Training Regiment (Resimen Induk Kodam XVII/Cenderawasih)
 Regiment HQ
 Satuan Dodik Latpur (Combat Training Command Unit)
 Satuan Dodik Kejuruan (Specialist Training Command Unit)
 Sekolah Calon Bintara (Non-Commissioned Officer Training School)
 Sekolah Calon Tamtama (Enlisted Training School)
 Satuan Dodik Bela Negara (National Defence Training Command Unit)

Support units 
The other support units are:
Military Police Command(Pomdam XVII/Cenderawasih)
Public Relations (Pendam XVII/Cenderawasih)
Adjutant General's Bureau (Anjendam XVII/Cenderawasih)
Military Physical Fitness and Sports (Jasdam XVII/Cenderawasih)
Medical Department (Kesdam XVII/Cenderawasih)
Veterans and Reserves Administration (Babiminvetcadam XVII/Cenderawasih)
Topograph (Topdam XVII/Cenderawasih)
Chaplaincy Corps (Bintaldam XVII/Cenderawasih)
Treasury (Kudam XVII/Cenderawasih)
Legal Affairs (Kumdam XVII/Cenderawasih)
HQ Detachment (Detasemen XVII/Cenderawasih)
Information and Data Center(Infolahtadam XVII/Cenderawasih)
Supply (Bekangdam XVII/Cenderawasih)
Transport (Hubdam XVII/Cenderawasih)
Ordnance (Paldam XVII/Cenderawasih)
Corps of Engineers (Zidam XVII/Cenderawasih)
Signals (Sandidam XVII/Cenderawasih)
Intelligence Detachment (Deninteldam XVII/Cenderawasih)

Notes

External links 
 

05
Papua (province)
Military units and formations established in 1963
Indonesian Army